"Wonderful You" is a single by the English pop-soul singer Rick Astley released in 1991 as a promo single.

Track listing
Wonderful You (Single Edit) - 4:13
Wonderful You (Album Version) - 5:12

Personnel 
 Rick Astley – lead vocals 
 Elton John – acoustic piano 
 Robert Ahwai – guitars
 Niels-Henning Ørsted Pedersen – double bass
 Per Lindval – drums 
 Dan Higgins – saxophone solo 
 Anne Dudley – string arrangements and conductor 
 Kevin Dorsey – backing vocals 
 Phil Perry – backing vocals

See also
Never Gonna Give You Up
Rickrolling
Rick Astley
Free

References

External links
Keep It Turned On (album) in Rickastley.co.uk

1990 songs
1991 singles
1992 singles
Rick Astley songs
Songs written by Rick Astley
RCA Records singles